Haruna Mawa is a Ugandan football coach and former footballer. As a player, he played for Rayon Sports in Rwanda. In November 2016, he was appointed as coach of the Somalia national football team.

References

External links

 Haruna Mawa Interview

Living people
Somalia national football team managers
Rayon Sports F.C. players
Ugandan footballers
Ugandan football managers
Association footballers not categorized by position
Year of birth missing (living people)
Ugandan expatriate sportspeople in Somalia
Ugandan expatriate football managers
Expatriate football managers in Somalia